Steen Kjøhede (born 5 May 1945) is a Danish sailor. He competed in the Finn event at the 1972 Summer Olympics.

References

External links
 

1945 births
Living people
Danish male sailors (sport)
Olympic sailors of Denmark
Sailors at the 1972 Summer Olympics – Finn
Sportspeople from Frederiksberg